The Merriam's elk (Cervus canadensis merriami) is an extinct subspecies of elk once found in the arid lands of the southwestern United States (in Arizona, New Mexico and Texas), as well as in Mexico. From the first New World arrival of Europeans, unregulated hunting, rapid growth of farms and ranches, and uncontrolled livestock grazing had driven the subspecies into extinction. Actual records on wildlife management were not reliably maintained until the late 19th century; the population of Merriam’s elk was experiencing notable decline by the beginning of the 20th century, with the (approximate) year being 1906. 

Another subspecies of elk, the eastern elk (Cervus canadensis canadensis), also became extinct at roughly the same time. Little is known about this subspecies, other than that it once numbered in the tens of millions, and was the main elk subspecies inhabiting areas east of the Mississippi River (though it was noted to have ranged as far west as Wyoming and Utah). Once found in virtually all of the states of the northeast and southeast (including all of the Eastern Seaboard from Maine to Georgia, and the Midwestern United States), the eastern elk disappeared prior to serious, scientific studies or surveys having taken place. Elk from Yellowstone National Park were introduced throughout this area in 1913, and are reasonably common in the area today. A notable population seems to be thriving in and around the Great Smoky Mountains, the Blue Ridge Mountains, and the Daniel Boone National Forest.

As for Merriam’s elk, as of 2017, the International Union for Conservation of Nature (IUCN) has reclassified all North American elk subspecies (excluding the Tule and Roosevelt elk) as C. c. canadensis; If this taxonomy is accurate, then the Merriam’s subspecies is not truly extinct but, rather, extirpated (driven away) or depleted from large swathes of its former home range.

See also
Roosevelt elk
Tule elk
Rocky Mountain elk
Eastern elk

General:
List of extinct animals of North America

References 

Elk and red deer
Mammal extinctions since 1500
Extinct mammals
Extinct animals of the United States
Extinct animals of Mexico
Species made extinct by human activities